North Union Township is a township in Schuylkill County, Pennsylvania, United States. The population was 1,417 at the 2020 census.

Geography

According to the United States Census Bureau, the township has a total area of 20.0 square miles (51.9 km), of which 20.0 square miles (51.8 km)  is land and 0.04 square mile (0.1 km)  (0.20%) is water.

Demographics

At the 2000 census there were 1,225 people, 504 households, and 337 families living in the township.  The population density was 61.2 people per square mile (23.6/km).  There were 598 housing units at an average density of 29.9/sq mi (11.5/km).  The racial makeup of the township was 97.96% White, 0.57% Asian, 0.73% from other races, and 0.73% from two or more races. Hispanic or Latino of any race were 0.49%.

Of the 504 households 27.4% had children under the age of 18 living with them, 55.8% were married couples living together, 7.5% had a female householder with no husband present, and 33.1% were non-families. 28.4% of households were one person and 15.9% were one person aged 65 or older.  The average household size was 2.43 and the average family size was 3.00.

The age distribution was 21.0% under the age of 18, 6.8% from 18 to 24, 28.6% from 25 to 44, 26.9% from 45 to 64, and 16.8% 65 or older.  The median age was 41 years. For every 100 females, there were 100.2 males.  For every 100 females age 18 and over, there were 100.0 males.

The median household income was $34,659 and the median family income  was $42,262. Males had a median income of $31,506 versus $22,188 for females. The per capita income for the township was $17,108.  About 6.8% of families and 9.1% of the population were below the poverty line, including 15.6% of those under age 18 and 6.5% of those age 65 or over.

References

Townships in Schuylkill County, Pennsylvania
Townships in Pennsylvania